Ariela Barer (born ) is an American actress, best known for playing the role of Gert Yorkes in the Hulu original series Runaways.

Early life
Barer's parents are Mexican-born Jews. Her sister is Libe Barer, who is also an actress.

Career
Ariela Barer started acting at the age of three and started professionally at nine. She has since starred in a variety of projects and performed as part of an indie rock band called The Love-Inns. She was cast as Gert Yorkes on Runaways, which aired its first season on Hulu, as part of its original programming, from November 21, 2017 to January 9, 2018. She also portrayed Carmen on One Day at a Time and Bailey Bennett on Atypical.

Personal life
On November 3, 2016, Barer publicly came out as gay with a status update on Twitter. Barer uses she/her and they/them pronouns.

Filmography

Film

Television

References

External links
 

1998 births
21st-century American actresses
21st-century American singers
American child actresses
American musicians of Mexican descent
American people of Mexican-Jewish descent
American television actresses
Jewish American actresses
American lesbian actresses
LGBT Hispanic and Latino American people
Living people
Place of birth missing (living people)
Lesbian Jews
American non-binary actors
Hispanic and Latino American actresses
21st-century American Jews
21st-century American LGBT people
American actresses of Mexican descent